William Arthur Noble (September 13, 1866 – January 6, 1945), who published under the name W. Arthur Noble, was an American missionary of the Methodist Episcopal Church in Pyongyang, Korea and Seoul, Korea from 1892 to 1934.

Biography 
Noble was born in Springville, PA. He was married to Mattie Wilcox Noble; their children included Ruth Noble Appenzeller Knight, Harold Joyce Noble, born January 19, 1903, who went on to become a Japanese language officer with the United States Marine Corps during World War II and later a United States diplomat in South Korea, Marine Biology professor at University of the Pacific and director of the Marine Research Laboratory at Dillon's Beach, CA, Alden Earl Noble, (1899-1961), and identical twins, Glenn Arthur Noble and Elmer Ray Noble, born January 16, 1909. Noble died in Stockton, CA.

Publications

References
 
 
 

1866 births
1945 deaths
American Methodist missionaries
Methodist missionaries in Korea
American expatriates in Korea